So Long, See You Tomorrow may refer to:
So Long, See You Tomorrow (novel), 1980
So Long, See You Tomorrow (album), 2014